Cierre Marcelle Wood (born February 21, 1991) is a former American football running back. He played college football at Notre Dame. He was signed as an undrafted free agent by the Houston Texans in 2013.

High school career
Wood attended Santa Clara High School in Oxnard, California. He rushed for 1,632 yards and 20 touchdowns and caught eight passes for 182 yards and four touchdowns as a senior. During his junior year, he had 2,612 yards rushing with 34 touchdowns. Wood was a USA Today All-American in 2008. He was also selected to play in the 2009 U.S. Army All-American Bowl in San Antonio, Texas.

Considered a four-star recruit by Rivals.com, Wood was listed as the No. 8 running back in the nation. He chose to attend Notre Dame over USC, UCLA, and California.

College career
After redshirting in the 2009 season, Wood emerged on the depth chart as the No. 2 running back in 2010. He was used sparingly over the first few games, but after an injury to starter Armando Allen, he started the final six games where he recorded 603 yards on 119 carries and three touchdowns, and 20 receptions for 170 yards and 2 touchdowns. In his junior year, he took over the starting role. He recorded 1,102 yards on 217 carries (5.1 AVG) and 9 touchdowns, and 27 receptions for 187 yards. In 2012, Wood had been suspended for the opening two games, against Navy and Purdue, for violating team rules. In the final 11 games, he rushed for 742 yards on 114 carries (6.5 avg) and four touchdowns after splitting carries with classmate Theo Riddick.

Professional career

In January 2013, Wood decided to forgo his final year of eligibility, entering the 2013 NFL Draft. He went undrafted and was signed as a free agent with the Houston Texans hours after the draft.

Houston Texans
The Texans released Wood, along with two others players, on October 21, 2013, for unspecified violations of team rules prior to a game in Kansas City.

New England Patriots
The New England Patriots signed Wood to their practice squad on November 5, 2013. He was released on December 26, 2013.

Baltimore Ravens
He was signed by the Ravens to a reserve-future deal on January 15, 2014. The Ravens released Wood on August 25, 2014.

Seattle Seahawks
Wood was signed by the Seahawks to their practice squad on November 12, 2014.

Buffalo Bills
The Buffalo Bills signed Wood to their roster on August 19, 2015. On September 4, 2015, he was released by the Bills. On September 6, 2015, the Bills signed Wood to their practice squad. Wood was promoted to the Bills active roster on Friday October 2. However, in Week 5, Wood tore his ACL, ending his season.

Hamilton Tiger-Cats
Wood signed with the Canadian football team, the Hamilton Tiger-Cats on March 9, 2017.

Montreal Alouettes 
On May 1, 2017, Wood was traded to the Montreal Alouettes along with defensive end Denzell Perine, in exchange for defensive back Khalid Wooten. He was released on May 1, 2018.

Personal life
Wood and his girlfriend were arrested on April 10, 2019 by the Las Vegas Metropolitan Police Department on charges of first-degree homicide and child abuse, after the death of the girlfriend's five year-old daughter, who was found with extreme bruising and trauma. Wood was additionally accused of forcing the child to participate in extreme exercise routines as a punishment for being overweight. Wood is currently in the custody of Clark County, Nevada without any bond.

References

External links
Notre Dame Fighting Irish bio

1991 births
Living people
Sportspeople from Oxnard, California
American football running backs
Canadian football running backs
American players of Canadian football
Notre Dame Fighting Irish football players
Players of American football from California
Houston Texans players
New England Patriots players
Baltimore Ravens players
Seattle Seahawks players
Buffalo Bills players
Hamilton Tiger-Cats players
Montreal Alouettes players
Sportspeople from Ventura County, California